Sharq or Sharqi, from Arabic and Persian 'East', may refer to:

Places
Sharq, Iran
Sharqi, Iran
Sharqi Rural District, Iran
 Sharq, Kuwait

Other uses
 Sharq (TV channel), Afghanistan
 Sharq (magazine), a 1924–1932 Persian literary magazine
 Sharq, a subsidiary company of SABIC 
 Sharq COD, a Saudi football team
 Sharqi dynasty, rulers of the Jaunpur Sultanate
 Sharqi (wind), a seasonal wind in the Middle East

See also
 
 Ash Sharqiyah (disambiguation)
 East (disambiguation)
 Shark (disambiguation)
 Mashriq, the historical region of the Arab world to the east of Egypt